Mountaineer Range is the range of mountains lying between the Mariner and Aviator Glaciers in Victoria Land, Antarctica. The seaward parts of the range were first viewed by Ross in 1841, and subsequently by several British and later American expeditions. The precise mapping of its overall features was accomplished from U.S. Navy air photographs and surveys by New Zealand and American parties in the 1950s and 1960s. Named by the New Zealand Geological Survey Antarctic Expedition (NZGSAE), 1958–59, in keeping with the backgrounds of members of the 1957–58 and 1958–59 field parties who made a reconnaissance of the area, and also in association with the names "Aviator" and "Mariner".

Discovered in January 1841 by Ross who named this feature for Sir Roderick Impey Murchison, then general secretary of the British Association.

List of mountains 
Mount Murchison, 
 Mount Anakiwa,  situated 3 nautical miles (6 km) north of Mount Supernal. Named by the northern party of NZGSAE, 1966–67, after the Cobham Outward Bound School, Anakiwa, New Zealand.
 Mount Brabec,

References

 
Borchgrevink Coast